Sara Savatović (born 5 January 1993) is a Serbian track and field athlete who holds Serbian records in the women's hammer throw and indoor weight throw. She is a seven-time Serbian national champion in the hammer throw.

Career
Savatović began her career in 2008. She competed in the 2009 World Youth Championships in Athletics in Brixen, Italy. In January 2013, she moved to Manhattan, Kansas to compete in track and field for Kansas State University. She ended her athletic career as a three-time Big 12 Conference champion in the hammer throw and a two-time Big 12 Conference champion in the weight throw. She was the 2016 NCAA Division I Outdoor Track and Field Championships runner-up in the hammer throw.

Personal bests

Hammer Throw Progression

References

1993 births
Serbian female hammer throwers
Living people